Crash & Bernstein is an American live action television comedy with puppetry which aired from October 8, 2012, to August 11, 2014, on Disney XD.

Created by Eric Friedman, the series centers around a boy with three sisters who wishes to have a brother. His wishes come true when a puppet named Crash comes to life. 

Throughout its run, 39 episodes of Crash & Bernstein aired.

Series overview

Episodes

Season 1 (2012–13)
Cole Jensen, Tim Lagasse and Landry Bender appear in all the episodes.
Oana Gregory has been absent in 5 episodes.
Aaron R. Landon has been absent in 7 episodes.

Season 2 (2013–14)
On April 15, 2013, Disney XD renewed the series for a second season, which premiered on October 7, 2013.
"Escape from Bigfoot Island" premiered on July 18, 2014, as part of the Show Me the Shark special featuring other Disney XD original series episodes with shark themed titles: Mighty Med (Are You Afraid of the Shark?), Kickin It (Tightroping the Shark), Lab Rats (Cyborg Shark Attack), Randy Cunningham: 9th Grade Ninja (On the Poolfront/Flume-Ignation) and Wander Over Yonder (The Party Animal).
Cole Jensen and Tim Lagasse appear in all the episodes.
Landry Bender, Oana Gregory and Aaron R. Landon have been absent in 3 episodes each.

References

External links

 
 

Lists of American children's television series episodes
Lists of American sitcom episodes
Lists of Disney Channel television series episodes